Mucurilebias leitaoi is a species of rivulid killifish endemic to Brazil where it occurs, or formerly occurred, in the basin of the Mucuri River.  This species can reach a length of  TL.  This species has not been seen since the original series of types was collected in 1988 and it may have become extinct due to the extensive habitat loss in the region. This species is the only known member of its genus, but it was formerly included in Leptolebias. The specific name of this fish honours the Brazilian ichthyologist  and herpetologist Antenor Leitão de Carvalho (1910-1985).

References

Monotypic fish genera
Rivulidae
Fish of the Mucuri River basin
Endemic fauna of Brazil
Fish described in 1992